Edmund Dunne may refer to:
 Edmund Francis Dunne, American politician and jurist
 Edmund Michael Dunne, American prelate of the Roman Catholic Church